Noah Durham Comstock (November 22, 1832June 6, 1890) was an American farmer and Republican politician.  He served four years in the Wisconsin State Senate and four years in the State Assembly, representing Trempealeau County.

Biography

Born in Lowville, New York, Comstock moved to Calhoun County, Michigan, in 1850. In 1851, he moved to Indiana and then in 1853, Comstock moved to California. In 1855, Comstock settled in the town of Arcadia, Trempealeau County, Wisconsin and was a farmer. Comstock served as the Arcadia Town Treasurer in 1858 and Trempealeau County Treasurer in 1860, 1862, and 1864. He also served on the Trempealeau County Board of Supervisors in 1868. In 1872, 1874, 1876, and 1876, Comstock served in the Wisconsin State Assembly and was a Republican. From 1883 to 1887, Comstock also served in the Wisconsin State Senate. Comstock died of heart disease in Arcadia, Wisconsin.

References

External links
 

1832 births
1890 deaths
People from Arcadia, Wisconsin
People from Lowville, New York
Farmers from Wisconsin
County supervisors in Wisconsin
Republican Party members of the Wisconsin State Assembly
Republican Party Wisconsin state senators
19th-century American politicians